Mariscal is a surname. Notable people with the surname include:

 Alberto Mariscal (1926–2010), American-born Mexican actor and film director
 Ana Mariscal (1923–1995), Spanish film actress, director, screenwriter and film producer
 Ángel Mariscal (1904—1979), Spanish footballer
 Antonio Mariscal (1915–2010), Mexican lawyer and Olympic-level diver
 Ignacio Mariscal (1829–1910), Mexican liberal lawyer, politician, writer, and diplomat
 Javier Mariscal (born 1950), Spanish artist and designer 
 Jaziel Mariscal (born 1994), Mexican footballer
 Kary Mariscal (born 1976), Bolivian politician
 Marco Antonio Barba Mariscal (born 1970), Mexican politician
 Margarita Mariscal de Gante (born 1954), Spanish judge and politician
 Mark Mariscal (born 1979), American college and professional football 
 Silvia Mariscal (born 1946), Mexican actress
 María José Mariscal (born 2005), Mexican actress